Persikama stands for Persatuan Sepakbola Indonesia Kabupaten Magelang (en: Football Association of Indonesia Magelang Regency) is an Indonesian football club based in Magelang Regency, Central Java. They currently compete in the Liga 3.

References

External links

Magelang Regency
Sport in Central Java
Football clubs in Indonesia
Football clubs in Central Java
Association football clubs established in 1986
1986 establishments in Indonesia